David Caesar (born 1963) is an Australian television and film director and writer. He grew up in Turlinjah on the south coast of NSW and attended school in nearby Moruya where he was school captain in his senior year.

Caesar graduated from the Australian Film Television and Radio School in 1987. He won an AWGIE and best director at Shanghai Film Festival for his film MULLET.  He won a Queensland Premiers Literary award for the screenplay for PRIME MOVER in 2008.

Television credits
 Dangerous (TV series)
 RAN Remote Area Nurse (TV series)
 Fireflies (TV series)
 CrashBurn
 Bad Cop, Bad Cop
 Water Rats
 Stingers
 All Saints (TV series)
 Wildside (Australian TV series)
 Halifax f.p.
 Twisted Tales (TV series)
 The Feds (telemovie)
 Bananas in Pyjamas
 K-9 (TV series) – Regeneration (Series 1; Episode 1)
 K-9 (TV series) – Liberation (Series 1; Episode 2)
 Rush (TV series)
 Razor (TV series)
 Cops LAC (TV series)
 Phryne Fisher (TV series)

Film credits
 Greenkeeping (1992)
 Idiot Box (1996)
 Mullet (2001)
 Dirty Deeds (2002)
 Prime Mover (2009)
 Nowhere Boys: The Book of Shadows (2016)

External links

References

Australian film directors
Australian film producers
Australian screenwriters
1963 births
Living people
Australian television directors
Writers from New South Wales
Australian Film Television and Radio School alumni